Born to Kill is a British television drama, produced by World Productions, that was first broadcast on Channel 4 from 20 April to 11 May 2017. The four-part serial stars Jack Rowan as Sam Woodford, a seemingly ordinary 16-year-old schoolboy who harbours secret psychopathic tendencies. The series also stars Romola Garai as Sam's mother, Jenny; Lara Peake as Sam's girlfriend, Chrissie; Earl Cave as Sam's only friend, Oscar; Daniel Mays as Chrissie's father, Bill; and Richard Coyle as Sam's father, Peter. The series was written and created by Tracey Malone and Kate Ashfield, becoming Malone's second original television production following Rillington Place. The series is distributed worldwide by BBC Worldwide.

The series serves as Rowan's first leading television role, having only previously appeared as a regular character in Beowulf: Return to the Shieldlands. The series achieved average viewing figures for its time slot, with 2.43 million viewers tuning in for episode one, and a slight drop to 1.74 million for episode two. The complete series was released on DVD on 12 June 2017. The series serves as Rowan's first leading television role, having only previously appeared as a regular character in Beowulf: Return to the Shieldlands. The series achieved average viewing figures for its time slot, with 2.43 million viewers tuning in for episode one, and a slight drop to 1.74 million for episode two. The complete series was released on DVD on 12 June 2017.

Cast
 Jack Rowan as Sam Woodford, a 16-year-old schoolboy with psychopathic tendencies
 Romola Garai as Jenny Woodford, Sam's mother who works as a nurse at the local hospital
 Lara Peake as Chrissie Anderson, a fellow student with whom Sam enters a relationship
 Daniel Mays as Bill Anderson, Chrissie's father
 Richard Coyle as Peter Woodford, Sam's biological father
 Earl Cave as Oscar, a schoolboy that Sam befriends
 Jeany Spark as Lauren, Oscar's mother
 Simon Bubb as Mike, Oscar's father, 
 Elizabeth Counsell as Margaret Anderson, Bill's mother and Chrissie's grandmother
 Karl Johnson as Mr. Williams, a hospital patient whom Sam befriends
 Sharon Small as Cathy, Jenny's best friend and colleague
 James Greene as Bob Franklin, a hospital patient whom Sam befriends
 Lolita Chakrabarti as Helen Deverill, a psychologist who represents Jenny during Peter's parole hearing
 Pal Aron as Philip, a prison liaison officer working on behalf of Peter's parole board

Episodes

References

External links

2010s British drama television series
2010s British television miniseries
2017 British television series debuts
2017 British television series endings
Channel 4 television dramas
Television series by ITV Studios
Television series by World Productions
English-language television shows
Murder in television
Television series about dysfunctional families
Television series about teenagers
Television shows set in the United Kingdom